"Miss the Rage" is a song by American rappers Trippie Redd and Playboi Carti, released on May 7, 2021, as the lead single for Trippie's fourth studio album, Trip at Knight.

Background
Trippie originally teased the track on Instagram in December 2020. Later, an edit of the song containing Playboi Carti's vocals from "Want To" (his leaked collaboration with the late Juice WRLD) atop the song's beat, went viral on TikTok. The popularity of the edit led to Trippie asking Carti to feature on the track. The cover art and release date were revealed on May 3, 2021. The song's title also became a motto on Trippie's social media posts.

The song's title refers to the act of missing the rage Trippie Redd experienced while performing at concerts, due to the COVID-19 pandemic. Trippie explained: "I been locked away. I'm one of them people that's at the festivals, I come out going crazy out the rips. I'm ready to get back to my stage presence. I'm tired of this shit. I'm tired of sitting in the house 'cause that's all I been doing. With all the COVID shit going on, I was just in my creative space making music that I really fucked with". The song has been deemed a "high octane" track.

Composition

The track features Trippie Redd and Playboi Carti rapping over a beat made by Dutch producer Loesoe. The main melodic element of the beat is a reversed royalty-free synth loop from the Cymatics.fm pack "ODYSSEY EDM Sample Pack". The loop was composed and produced by Simon Skylar, who isn't credited on the track because loops sold by Cymatics.fm are generally royalty-free.

Music video
A lyric video was released on May 7, 2021 on Trippie Redd's YouTube channel. The video is entirely animated and is animated by Zach Okami and Chadwick Makela. The lyric video features a repetitive looped animation where the animation speed slows down, speeds up and reverses in time with the rhythm of the music. The animation itself features Trippie Redd holding a sword in a knight outfit slicing blood through the air with his sword as well as various creatures advancing towards him. Later on May 27, 2021, an official music video featuring both Trippie Redd and Playboi Carti was released. It features both artists in a junk yard destroying a car and other various items.

Charts

Weekly charts

Year-end charts

The song is Trippie Redd and Playboi Carti's highest-charting song on the US Hot 100.

Certifications

References

2021 songs
2021 singles
Trippie Redd songs
Songs written by Trippie Redd
Playboi Carti songs
Songs written by Playboi Carti
Trap music songs
Hyperpop songs
Cloud rap songs